Haywrights was a New Zealand department store chain that was founded in 1929 and eventually grew to be one of the largest department store chains in New Zealand.

History 
The store opened on 13 December 1929 as Hay's. It was founded by businessman and philanthropist James Hay.

In 1968, the chain merged with Wright Stephenson (retail arm) to form Hay's-Wright Stephenson, with this the chain expanded into the North Island. On 1 August 1970 Hay's-Wright Stephenson became Haywrights after much confusion among customers about the name.

In January 1976 Haywrights purchased the Milne & Choyce chain, in an effort to expand further into the North Island. 30–40 employees were laid off at the Mount Roskill Warehouse and at the Downtown Shopping Centre store

In 1980 Haywrights merged with the Farmers Co-operative Association and rebranded to Farmers-Haywrights. Then in 1982 Bunting & Co. acquired the Co-operative Association and sold the remaining assets to the Farmers Trading Company for $12 Million, of the remaining 18 branches FTC bought 13 and a distribution centre in Christchurch, with this all stores were rebranded to Farmers.

Stores

Gallery

References 

1929 establishments in New Zealand
1987 disestablishments in New Zealand
Department stores of New Zealand
Companies based in Christchurch
Defunct retail companies of New Zealand